Cook Islands competed at the 2011 Pacific Games in Nouméa, New Caledonia between August 27 and September 10, 2011. As of June 28, 2011 Cook Islands has listed 212 competitors.

Athletics

Cook Islands has qualified 2 athletes.

Women
Patricia Taea
Tereapii Tapoki

Bodybuilding

Cook Islands has qualified 5 athletes.

Men
Teinaki Rasmussen
Dean Teiho
Okirua Jonathan Enoka
Daniel Tupou Ahau
Aaron Enoka

Boxing

Cook Islands has qualified 3 athletes.

Men
Rei Marcus Jack
Etu Iorangi -  -75 kg
Osolai Kolbe Akai

Canoeing

Cook Islands has qualified 20 athletes.

Men
Joseph Nimarota Amo -  V1 15 km
Tungane Manuel
Roland Tamatoa Maru
John Taulu
Allister Webb
George Andre Tutaka
Tamati Iro
Marona Mita

Women
Paulina Beddoes -  V6 20 km,  V6 500m
Tara Cummings -  V6 20 km,  V6 500m
Anne Patricia Fisher -  V6 20 km,  V6 500m
Vaea Melvin -  V6 20 km,  V6 500m
Tuangaru Jean Rimatuu -  V6 20 km,  V6 500m
Emilene Teuila Taulu -  V6 500m
Teokotai Cummings -  V6 20 km
Myland Tungata Lane
Tepori Elizabeth Tama
Christine Joy Thomas
Danielle Tungane Cochrane
Joyce Fortes

Football

Cook Islands has qualified a men's and women's team.  Each team can consist of a maximum of 21 athletes.

Men
Tony Lloyd Jamieson
John Pareanga
Nathan Yomsaung Tisam
Roger Tereapii Manuel
John Quijano
Allan Hans Boere
Joseph Bryant Hamilton Ngauora
Grover Zinedine Harmon
Campbell Best
Nikorima Te Miha
Taylor Andrew Marsters Saghabi
Paul Branden Taura Turepu
Nicholas Akavi Funnell
Mii Tamariki Joseph
Tahiri Elikana
Geongsa Tuka Tisam
Anonga Nardu Tisam
Ngatokorua  Elikana

Women
Tekura-O-Tane Tutai
Courtney Napa
Upokotea Diane Manuela
Natasha Dean
Elizabeth Poea Harmon
Mama Henry
Leiana Shyann Temata
Marissa Iroa
Josephine Clark Turepu
Jennifer Akavi
Hurata Saramata Takai
Louisa Manico
Tepaeru Helen Toka
Dayna Victoria Napa
Mii Yvonne Piri
Tekura Kaukura
Marjorie Toru
Aketuke Linade Unuka

Golf

Cook Islands has qualified 8 athletes.

Men
Royle Brogan
Sonny Teokotai Raemaki
Kirk Tuaiti
Daniel Webb

Women
Tania Karati
Maria Kenning
Tuaine Elaine Marsters
Priscilla Elmay Viking -  Individual Tournament

Sailing

Cook Islands has qualified 6 athletes.

Peter Taua Elisa Henry -  Laser Men Team
Grand Junior David Charlie Poiri -  Laser Men Team
Tanus Keeanu Henry
Aquila Tatira
Helema William -  Laser Women,  Laser Women Team
Teau Moana McKenzie -  Laser Women Team,  Laser Women

Squash

Cook Islands has qualified 7 athletes.

Men
Marlon Torres Manlangit -  Team Tournament
Josia Taio -  Team Tournament
Lyall Tom Marsters -  Team Tournament
Tuakeu Tuakeu -  Team Tournament
Manu Priest -  Team Tournament
Ianis Boaza

Women
Christine Ina Hunter

Rugby Sevens

Cook Islands has qualified a women's team.  Each team can consist of a maximum of 12 athletes.

Women
Nooroa Maui
Maggie Toka
Jamie Kowhai Gotty
Awhitia Pepe
Princess Mary Adams
Margaret Teremoana
Nareta Marsters
Julie Ann Taripo
Vanya Tou
Teivanui Maui
Vaine Ben
Edith Micholas
Monique Moeara

Tennis

Cook Islands has qualified 2 athletes.

Women
Davina Ashford
Brittany Teei

Triathlon

Cook Islands has qualified 1 athlete.

Women
Rangi Apera

Volleyball

Beach Volleyball

Cook Islands has qualified a men's and women's team.  Each team can consist of a maximum of 2 members.

Men
Brendon Heath
James Pori

Women
Tepori Rongokea
Alanna Smith

Weightlifting

Cook Islands has qualified 3 athletes.

Men
Samuel Jnr Pera
Sirla Pera

Women
Luisa Peters

References

2011 in Cook Islands sport
Nations at the 2011 Pacific Games
Cook Islands at the Pacific Games